Justniffer is a TCP packet sniffer. It can log network traffic in a 'standard' (web server-like) or in a customized way. It can also log response times, useful for tracking network services performances (e.g. web server, application server, etc.).
The output format of the traffic can be easily customized. An example written in Python (delivered with the official package) stores the transferred contents in an output directory separated by domains. This means that the transferred files like html, css, javascript, images, sounds, etc. can be saved to a directory.

Overview
justniffer was born to help in troubleshooting performance in network TCP-based services: HTTP, RTSP, SIP, SMTP, IMAP, POP, LDAP, Telnet etc.

It can collect low and high level protocol and performance information, reconstructing the TCP flow in a reliable way using portions of the Linux kernel code. It uses a slightly modified version of the libnids libraries that already include a modified version of Linux kernel code in a more reusable way.
It can be extended with external scripts (bash, Python, or any executable) and generate logs in a customizable way

The man page for justniffer explains all the options.

External links
Official website
Justniffer - tcp packet sniffer
Lars Michelsen

Examples
Examples

Grab http traffic and observe
Grab Http traffic

See also
Comparison of packet analyzers
 tcpdump, a packet analyzer
 pcap, an application programming interface (API) for capturing network traffic
 snoop, a command line packet analyzer included with Solaris
 wireshark, a network packet analyzer
 dsniff, a packet sniffer and set of traffic analysis tools
 netsniff-ng, a free Linux networking toolkit
 ngrep, a tool that can match regular expressions within the network packet payloads
 etherape, a network mapping tool that relies on sniffing traffic
 tcptrace, a tool for analyzing the logs produced by tcpdump
 Microsoft Network Monitor, a packet analyzer

Network analyzers
Free network management software